W. Robert Godfrey is a minister in the United Reformed Churches in North America and formerly served as the third president of Westminster Seminary California. As of 2017 he is president emeritus and professor emeritus of church history. He currently is chairman of Ligonier Ministries, located in Sanford, Florida, a position he took over from the late Dr. R. C. Sproul.

He has taught at Westminster Seminary California since 1981 and previously taught at Westminster Theological Seminary in Philadelphia, as well as Gordon-Conwell Theological Seminary and Stanford University. He is a council member of the Alliance of Confessing Evangelicals, an organization of pastors and theologians from the Baptist, Presbyterian, Reformed, Anglican, Congregational, and Lutheran church communities. He has been a speaker at many theological conferences, including those sponsored by the Philadelphia Conference on Reformed Theology, Ligonier Ministries, and the Lausanne Committee for World Evangelization.

Godfrey earned his Master of Divinity from Gordon-Conwell Theological Seminary and a Master of Arts and PhD from Stanford University.

Godfrey grew up in Alameda, California, where his father and grandfather each served as mayor. He was introduced to Calvinism when he was a teenager. He lives in California with his wife Mary Ellen, with whom he has three grown children, who also reside in California.

Published works
Books written by Godfrey include the following:
Pleasing God in Our Worship (1999)
God's Pattern for Creation: A Covenantal Reading of Genesis 1 (2003)
Reformation Sketches: Insights into Luther, Calvin, and the Confessions (2003)
An Unexpected Journey: Discovering Reformed Christianity (2004, autobiographical)
John Calvin: Pilgrim and Pastor (2009)
Westminster Seminary California: A New Old School (2012, co-written with D. G. Hart)
Learning to Love the Psalms (2017)
Saving the Reformation: The Pastoral Theology of the Canons of Dort (2019)

He has written chapters or articles for the following books:
John Calvin: His Influence in the Western World (1982)
Through Christ's Word: A Festschrift for Dr. Philip E. Hughes (1985)
Theonomy: A Reformed Critique (1990, editor, along with William S. Barker)
The Agony of Deceit: What Some TV Preachers are Really Teaching (1990)
Roman Catholicism
Sola Scriptura!: The Protestant Position on the Bible (1995)
The Practice of Confessional Subscription (1995)
The Coming Evangelical Crisis: Current Challenges to Authority of Scripture and the Gospel (1996)
 
Godfrey has also written articles for journals such as the Westminster Theological Journal, Archive for Reformation History, and Sixteenth-Century Journal.

References

Living people
American Calvinist and Reformed theologians
Christians from California
Westminster Theological Seminary faculty
Gordon–Conwell Theological Seminary faculty
Stanford University faculty
Presidents of Calvinist and Reformed seminaries
Stanford University alumni
20th-century Calvinist and Reformed theologians
21st-century Calvinist and Reformed theologians
Westminster Seminary California faculty
1945 births